John Fedosoff (November 19, 1932 – February 16, 2023) was a former award-winning and Grey Cup champion Canadian Football League player.

Coming straight out of Mimico High School he joined the Toronto Argonauts in 1952 and won the Gruen Trophy for best rookie in the eastern Big Four (no stats were kept and only Canadians were eligible.) He also won the Grey Cup that year.  A versatile two way player, in 1955 he joined the Hamilton Tiger-Cats and had his best year, rushing for 241 yards and 4 touchdowns, and intercepting 3 passes (which was good for an All-Star selection on defence.) He also won his second Grey Cup in 1957 with the Ti-cats. He joined his home province Saskatchewan Roughriders in 1958, also playing 2 games with the Montreal Alouettes that season before retiring.

Fedosoff died February, 16, 2023 in  Peterborough, Ontario at the age of 90.

Notes

1932 births
2023 deaths
Toronto Argonauts players
Hamilton Tiger-Cats players
Saskatchewan Roughriders players
Montreal Alouettes players
Canadian Football League Rookie of the Year Award winners